Khwaja Mir Dard (1720-1785) was a poet of the Delhi School and a Sufi saint of the Naqshbandi-Mujaddadi religious order.

Poetry

Dard's couplet on this illusory life, from 'Ilm-ul-Kitab':

References

External links
 Ilm Ul Kitab
 Khwaja Mir Dard at Kavita Kosh (Hindi)
 Khwaja Mir Dard: Life and Ghazals

1721 births
1785 deaths
18th-century Indian Muslims
18th-century Indian poets
Urdu-language poets
Sufi poets
18th-century Urdu-language writers
Urdu-language religious writers
Poets from Delhi
Urdu-language writers from British India
Urdu-language writers from Mughal India